Cornelius McQuade Duffy (7 March 1937 – 17 June 2013) was a Scottish footballer who played as an inside left. His most prominent spell was with Partick Thistle, and he was inducted into their 'Hall of Fame' in 2009.

Career
Duffy began his career in the SJFA with north Glasgow team Ashfield alongside future European Cup winner Stevie Chalmers, who stated in his autobiography that he felt Duffy was the more skilled of the pair of them. Both were selected for the Scotland team at that level before stepping up to senior football.

Other than a single Scottish Football League appearance on trial for Hamilton Academical, his first senior club was East Stirlingshire, followed by five years at Partick Thistle, during which the club made a challenge for the Scottish League title in the 1962–63 season, but lost form after delays caused by a very harsh winter. In late 1964 he moved on to St Johnstone in a swap deal involving Dan McLindon, resuming a playing partnership with Gordon Whitelaw.

Duffy then immigrated to South Africa where continued to be involved in football as a player and a coach. His son, also named Neil Duffy, likewise became a footballer, growing up in South Africa and initially playing there before establishing himself in the Scottish leagues.

References

1937 births
2013 deaths
Scottish footballers
Scottish emigrants to South Africa
Hamilton Academical F.C. players
Partick Thistle F.C. players
St Johnstone F.C. players
East Stirlingshire F.C. players
Scottish Football League players
Association football inside forwards
Ashfield F.C. players
Scottish Football League representative players
Scotland junior international footballers
Scottish Junior Football Association players
Footballers from Glasgow